The 1997 Asian Youth Boys Volleyball Championship was held in Baguio, Philippines from 5 to 10 April 1997.

Preliminary round

Pool A

|}

Pool B

|}

|}

Final round
 The results and the points of the matches between the same teams that were already played during the preliminary round shall be taken into account for the final round.

Classification 5th–8th

|}

|}

Championship

|}

Final standing

External links
 www.asianvolleyball.org
FIVB

A
V
V
Asian Boys' U18 Volleyball Championship
Sports in Benguet